Quimby's Bookstore is an independent bookstore located at 1854 W. North Ave in the Wicker Park neighborhood of Chicago, Illinois. In addition to the main location, Quimby's NYC opened in 2017 at 536 Metropolitan Ave in the Williamsburg neighborhood of Brooklyn, New York. Quimby's specializes in selling independently published and small press books, zines, comics, and ephemera, describing its collection as favoring "the unusual, the aberrant, the saucy and the lowbrow". The Chicago Tribune has described Quimby's as "a treasure" and "an unofficial clubhouse for zine lovers", and Inc. magazine has featured it as "Chicago's weirdest bookstore".

Description 

Along with a curated selection of traditionally published books, Quimby's Bookstore sells independent publications, often featuring bizarre or unusual subject matter. For those who are interested in the DIY ethic and self-publishing, the collection of zines and chapbooks at Quimby's has made it an international destination, with manager Liz Mason describing it as "a tourist destination for cool people". Nearly a quarter of the store's stock consists of self-published works purchased on consignment from artists and writers around the world.

Prominent themes in Quimby's stock include feminism, LGBTQ culture, punk, anarchy, and political and cultural resistance; other categories include fringe or counterculture topics such as conspiracies, erotica, and "mayhem".

Both stores host multiple events each month, including author readings, book signings, film screenings, and more. The Chicago store hosts pop-up shops at local events like the Chicago Zine Fest and the Chicago Alternative Comics Expo (CAKE), as well as hosting a yearly "zlumber party," an overnight event for zinesters to work on their creations. Quimby's Chicago is a long time supporter of zinesters and comic artists such as John Porcellino and former employee Edie Fake.

History 

Quimby's was opened September 15, 1991 by Steven Svymbersky; the original location was a former bodega at the corner of Damen and Evergreen. The name Quimby's came from the zine that Svymbersky had published for five years in Boston before moving to Chicago. Cartoonist Chris Ware was an early customer of the store who had coincidentally drawn a comic strip named "Quimby the Mouse"; Ware gave his permission for the mouse character to become the store's mascot, and he has designed each of the stores' logos.

By the mid 1990s, Quimby's was a Wicker Park mainstay and helped define the neighborhood "as a national epicenter of cutting-edge underground culture and cool". In 1997 Svymbersky sold the store to Eric Kirsammer, owner of Chicago Comics.

Svymbersky opened Quimby's NYC in 2017; the two bookstores share no financial relationship. Because Quimby's NYC is located next door to Desert Island Comics, it does not sell comics or graphic novels.

See also

 Books in the United States

References

External links 
  Quimby's Chicago
  Quimby's NYC
 A Behind-the-Scenes Tour of Quimby's with Liz Mason 30-minute video from the Chicago Zine Fest (2020)

Independent bookstores of the United States
Book selling websites
Business and industry organizations based in Chicago
Shops in New York City
Bookstores in New York City
Comics retailers
Bookstores established in the 20th century
American companies established in 1991
Retail companies established in 1991
1991 establishments in Illinois